Vyvyn Lazonga is a tattoo artist who began her career in Seattle in the early 1970s and was trained by Danny Danzl. She was the first woman to work for herself in the industry, not her husband or another male shop owner.  She worked in San Francisco and was tattooed by Ed Hardy in the 70s. She won the award for Best Tattooed Female in 1978 for his work. Later she was fortunate enough to meet Horiyoshi II at one of Lyle Tuttle's parties before returning in 1989 to open her studio in Seattle.

She has advocated the use of tattoos to cover mastectomy scars as an aid to recovery.

Historical significance
When she began tattooing, there were very few women who had tattoos, not to mention who were working as tattoo artists. When she opened her studio in 1979, there were only a few women tattooing on the west coast. She had a difficult time being treated as an equal in her craft and acquiring a full apprenticeship. Her work opened many doors for women in the tattoo industry, and is still seen as an example of a fine artist working in the tattoo medium. She was also a pioneer in the use of large-scale full-body tattoos in the West. Victoria Lautman has cited her as an artist who helped "to shift tattoos away from fashionable little rainbows, flowers, and unicorns to the larger, fine-arts-related custom designs."

She was also heavily tattooed at a time when it was unusual to see women with major tattoo work outside of sideshows. Asked about the public's perception of her full-sleeve tattoos, she said "I always felt strong and powerful about it, and I still do. But I try to keep my arms covered if I'm taking care of business -- I sorta wear a uniform according to what I'm doing. I want to get my business done quickly and easily, and I don't like having any hindrance or prejudice against me" (Vale and Juno 1989:125).

In her words:

Current works

Lazonga has been featured in many magazines and books and currently writes columns for various tattoo magazines, including a regular column in Skin and Ink. She has also won numerous awards, including the artist's choice award at the 2005 National Tattoo Association convention. She still owns and operates her own studio in a historic building in the Pike Place market, in Seattle.

Publications
2015 "100 Years of Tattoos," by David McComb, Laurence King Publishing Ltd
 
2015 "World Atlas of Tattoo," by Anna Felicity Friedman, Yale University Press
 
2014 Stylist Magazine, "Vyvyn Lazonga: La Première á Avoir Jeté L'encre," May Issue
 
2014 Tätowier Magazine, "Kosmetische Tätowierungen," January Issue
 
2010 "Inked," Inked Scene, Interview, April Issue
 
2010 Tattoo Flash, "The Time of Her Life," July Issue
 
2010 Skin Art, "Lessons from a Legend," Issue #130
 
2007 Tattoo Magazine, "Vyvyn Lazonga," April Issue #221
 
2007 San Francisco Gate, Interview: "Finding My Religion," February 20 Issue
 
2006 Skin & Ink
 
2006 Tattoo Magazine
 
2006-2008 Skin & Ink, Staff Writer 
 
2005 Venus Zine, Summer Issue
 
2005 Tattoo Magazine
 
2005 Total Tattoo Magazine, August Issue
 
2004 The Market News, August Issue
 
2004 Tattoo Flash
 
2002 "Tattoo Road Trip," by Bob Baxter, Schiffer Publishing
 
2002 International Tattoo Art Magazine, "Vyvyn Lazonga: In a Studio All Her Own," November Issue
 
2002 New York Times, Sunday Style Section, December Issue
 
1998-1999, The Tattooist's Yearbook, Milano, Italy
 
1998-1999, CNN Broadcast, "Women of the Ink" 
 
1998 "Bodies of Subversion," by Margo Mifflin, Powerhouse Books
 
1998 International Tattoo Magazine
 
1998 Skin & Ink
 
1996 "New Tattoo," by Victoria Lautman, Abbeville Press
 
1996 Skin Art
 
1996 Tattoo Magazine
 
1993 Tattoo Magazine
 
1993 Skin Art

1991 Elle Magazine
 
1989 RE/search, "Modern Primitives," by Andrea Juno & V. Vale, Issue #12
 
1988 Marks of Civilization, Museum of Cultural History, Los Angeles, CA
 
1977 "The Tattooists," by Albert L. Morse, San Francisco, CA
 
1976 Esquire Magazine

References

External links

1947 births
American tattoo artists
Living people